Yartashly (Yartaşlı) is a rural locality (a village) in Kysylsky Selsoviet, Alsheyevsky District, Bashkortostan, Russia. The population was 199 as of 2010. There are 4 streets.

Geography 
Yartashly is located 60 km southeast of Rayevsky (the district's administrative centre) by road. Zaypekul is the nearest rural locality.

References 

Rural localities in Alsheyevsky District